Accumulation: None is a compilation of rarities by the American singer-songwriter Bill Callahan, released under his then alias, Smog. It was put out on November 4, 2002, in Europe by Domino Records and a day later in North America by Drag City. The compilation includes the then-new song "White Ribbon."

Track listing
 "Astronaut" – 1:35
 From "My Shell" split single with Suckdog
 "A Hit" – 3:07
 From "A Hit" single on Drag City
 "Spanish Moss" – 2:12
 B-side of the Hausmusik 7" single "Came Blue"
 "Chosen One" (John Peel Session) – 4:36
 B-Side of the "Cold Blooded Old Times" single
 "Floating" – 1:15
 From the Floating EP on Drag City
 "Real Live Dress" – 5:24
 From the Australian-only EP The Manta Rays of Time
 "Came Blue" – 3:38
 A-side of the Hausmusik 7" single
 "Little Girl Shoes" – 5:18
 B-side of the "Ex-Con" 7" single
 "Cold Blooded Old Times" (Acoustic) – 3:45
 B-Side of the "Cold Blooded Old Times" single
 "White Ribbon" – 4:04
 New song
 "I Break Horses" (John Peel Session) – 6:14
 B-side of the "Cold Blooded Old Times" single
 "Hole in the Heart" – 0:44
 From the Floating EP

References

2002 compilation albums
Bill Callahan (musician) compilation albums
Domino Recording Company compilation albums
Drag City (record label) compilation albums